Arnebia is a genus of flowering plants in the family Boraginaceae. There are about 38 species, most are located in the Mediterranean region and eastwards to the Himalayas and one species extending down to tropical Africa.

The generic name "Arnebia" originates from the Arabic name shajaret el arneb.

The Arnebia genus was first established by Pher Forsskal in 1775, and mostly confined to Asia with a few species occurring in the drier parts of North Africa

Selected species
 Arnebia decumbens Cosson & Kralik
 Arnebia densiflora Ledeb.
 Arnebia echioides A.DC.- Prophet's flower
 Arnebia hispidissima A.DC.
 Arnebia lutea (A.Rich.) Armari

References

External links
 

Boraginoideae
Taxa named by Peter Forsskål
Boraginaceae genera